Ferrell-Holt House, also known as "Kirkside," is a historic home located at Moundsville, Marshall County, West Virginia. It was built in 1877, and is a two-story masonry dwelling in the Italianate style.

It was listed on the National Register of Historic Places in 1987.  It is located in the Moundsville Commercial Historic District, designated in 1998.

References

Houses on the National Register of Historic Places in West Virginia
Italianate architecture in West Virginia
Houses completed in 1877
Houses in Marshall County, West Virginia
National Register of Historic Places in Marshall County, West Virginia
Individually listed contributing properties to historic districts on the National Register in West Virginia
Moundsville, West Virginia
1877 establishments in West Virginia